Secor is a village in Clayton Township, Woodford County, Illinois, United States. The population was 373 at the 2010 census. It is part of the Peoria, Illinois Metropolitan Statistical Area. Secor is located just off U.S. Route 24 between El Paso and Eureka.

History 
The town was named after Charles A. Secor. A partner in the Engineering firm that laid out the eastern branch of the Peoria and Oquawka Railroad.

Geography
Secor is located at  (40.741074, -89.135875).

Demographics

As of the census of 2000, there were 379 people, 144 households, and 109 families residing in the village. The racial makeup of the village was 99.74% White and 0.26% African American.

There were 144 households, out of which 31.9% had children under the age of 18 living with them, 62.5% were married couples living together, 9.0% had a female householder with no husband present, and 24.3% were non-families. 18.8% of all households were made up of individuals, and 7.6% had someone living alone who was 65 years of age or older. The average household size was 2.63 and the average family size was 2.98.

In the village, the population was spread out, with 26.6% under the age of 18, 6.3% from 18 to 24, 26.9% from 25 to 44, 24.8% from 45 to 64, and 15.3% who were 65 years of age or older. The median age was 38 years. For every 100 females, there were 95.4 males. For every 100 females age 18 and over, there were 95.8 males.

The median income for a household in the village was $44,205, and the median income for a family was $44,722. Males had a median income of $32,232 versus $17,500 for females. The per capita income for the village was $22,635. About 9.4% of families and 8.2% of the population were below the poverty line, including 6.5% of those under age 18 and 17.2% of those age 65 or over.

Notable people
Wilhelmina "Minnie" Vautrin (1886-1941) born 27th September 1886 in Secor, IL.  Minnie, an American Missionary to China and known as the "Goddess of Mercy", was founder of Ginling Girls College in Nanjing China.  During WW II the city of Nanjing was invaded by Japanese Imperial troops in December 1937.  The invasion aftermath is known as the Nanjing Massacre.  She is highly honored in China for establishing a sanctuary on the grounds of the Ginling college in order to protect Chinese non-combatants from 6 weeks of killing, looting and raping.  Minnie was posthumously awarded the Emblem of the Blue Jade by the Chinese government for her actions during the massacre. She is buried in Salt River Cemetery nearby to Shepherd MI.

References

External links
 Village of Secor website

Villages in Woodford County, Illinois
Villages in Illinois
Peoria metropolitan area, Illinois